PIP in telecommunications and datacommunications stands for Private Internet Protocol or Private IP.  PIP refers to connectivity into a private extranet network which by its design emulates the functioning of the Internet.  Specifically, the Internet uses a routing protocol called border gateway protocol (BGP), as do most multiprotocol label switching (MPLS) networks.  With this design, there is an ambiguity to the route that a packet can take while traversing the network.  Whereas the Internet is a public offering, MPLS PIP networks are private.  This lends a known, often used, and comfortable network design model for private implementation.

Private IP removes the need for antiquated Frame Relay networks, and even more antiquated point-to-point networks, with the service provider able to offer a private extranet to its customer at an affordable pricepoint.

References

Network protocols